Bicyclus mesogena, the white-line bush brown, is a butterfly in the family Nymphalidae. It is found in Cameroon, the Democratic Republic of the Congo, Uganda, Kenya, Tanzania and Zambia. The habitat consists of forests, including riverine forests.

Adults are attracted to fermenting fruit.

Subspecies
Bicyclus mesogena mesogena (Cameroon, Democratic Republic of the Congo, western Kenya, Zambia)
Bicyclus mesogena ugandae (Riley, 1926) (Uganda, Tanzania)

References

Elymniini
Butterflies described in 1894
Butterflies of Africa